Erick José Castillo (born February 25, 1993) is a Venezuelan professional baseball catcher who is a free agent. He made his MLB debut in 2021 for the Chicago Cubs.

Career
Castillo signed with the Chicago Cubs as an international free agent in 2010, and made his professional debut in 2012. He split the 2021 season between the Tennessee Smokies of the Double-A South and the Iowa Cubs of the Triple-A East, slashing .199/.307/.246 with one home run and 19 RBIs over 57 games.

On September 30, 2021, the Cubs selected Castillo's contract and promoted him to the major leagues. He made his MLB debut that night. He recorded his first major league hit, a single, on October 1 versus Alex Reyes of the St. Louis Cardinals. He was designated for assignment by the team on October 18, 2021 and was assigned outright to Iowa two days later. He elected free agency on November 10, 2022.

References

External links

1993 births
Living people
People from Portuguesa (state)
Venezuelan expatriate baseball players in the United States
Major League Baseball players from Venezuela
Major League Baseball catchers
Chicago Cubs players
Dominican Summer League Cubs players
Arizona League Cubs players
Boise Hawks players
South Bend Cubs players
Tennessee Smokies players
Myrtle Beach Pelicans players
Iowa Cubs players
Caribes de Anzoátegui players